The North Korea women's national football team has represented North Korea (Korea DPR) at the FIFA Women's World Cup at four stagings of the tournament; they appeared in every edition from 1999 to 2011.

FIFA Women's World Cup record

*Draws include knockout matches decided on penalty kicks.

Record by opponent

1999 FIFA Women's World Cup

Group A

2003 FIFA Women's World Cup

Group A

2007 FIFA Women's World Cup

Group B

Quarterfinals

2011 FIFA Women's World Cup

Group C

Goalscorers

References

 
Countries at the FIFA Women's World Cup